Bernhard Fucik (born 26 September 1990) is an Austrian professional footballer who plays as a forward or winger for SC Katzelsdorf.

External links

Bernhard Fucik at ÖFB

1990 births
Living people
Austrian footballers
Sportspeople from Wiener Neustadt
Footballers from Lower Austria
Association football defenders
FC Admira Wacker Mödling players
First Vienna FC players
SKN St. Pölten players
SK Austria Klagenfurt players
Favoritner AC players
Austrian Football Bundesliga players
2. Liga (Austria) players